North Wiltshire was a local government district in Wiltshire, England, formed on 1 April 1974, by a merger of the municipal boroughs of Calne, Chippenham, and Malmesbury along with Calne and Chippenham Rural District, Cricklade and Wootton Bassett Rural District and Malmesbury Rural District. It shared its name with the North Wiltshire parliamentary constituency, the boundaries of which were coterminous with that of the district until 1997.

The new body's headquarters were in central Chippenham at Bewley House, a large office block which had been built in 1967 for Calne and Chippenham Rural District Council. They later moved to newly built offices at Monkton Park, another site in the town centre, overlooking the River Avon.

The district was abolished on 1 April 2009 as part of the 2009 structural changes to local government in England, when its functions were taken over by the new Wiltshire Council unitary authority.

Post-abolition events 
Wiltshire Council retained the Monkton Park building as a satellite of its main offices at County Hall, Trowbridge.

Some local services, which had been the responsibility of the district council and had passed in 2009 to Wiltshire Council, were later transferred to the larger town and parish councils. Thus, by 2019, Chippenham Town Council had taken charge of a large park, a community centre and play areas, as well as services such as grounds maintenance and street cleaning.

See also
North Wiltshire local elections

References

English districts abolished in 2009
Former non-metropolitan districts of Wiltshire